Mejit Airport is a public use airstrip on Mejit Island, Marshall Islands. This airstrip is assigned the location identifier Q30 by the FAA and MJB by the IATA.

Facilities 
Mejit Airport is at an elevation of 5 feet (2.5 m) above mean sea level. The runway is designated 07/25 with a coral gravel surface measuring 3,000 by 50 feet (914 x 15 m). There are no aircraft based at Mejit.

Airlines and destinations

References

External links 
AirNav airport information for Q30

Airports in the Marshall Islands